Clostridium isatidis is a Gram-positive, anaerobic and moderate thermophilic bacterium from the genus Clostridium.

References

 

Bacteria described in 1999
isatidis